Cleveland is a surname. Notable people with the surname include:

Annette Cleveland, member of the Washington State Senate since 2013
Cleaveland (whaling family), American whaling family of Martha's Vineyard and Nantucket
Ben Cleveland (born 1998), American football player
Benjamin Cleveland (1738–1806), American Revolutionary War patriot
Bill Cleveland (1902–1974), American businessman and politician
Carol Cleveland  (born 1942), British-American actress and comedian 
Charles Cleveland (disambiguation), multiple people
Chauncey Fitch Cleveland (1799-1887), American politician, governor of Connecticut
Dick Cleveland (1929–2002), American swimmer
Esther Cleveland (1893–1980), daughter of Grover and Frances Cleveland
Ezra Cleveland (born 1998), American football player
Frances Folsom Cleveland (1864–1947), wife of Grover Cleveland, and 28th First Lady of the United States
Grover Cleveland (1837–1908), 22nd and 24th president of the United States, 1885–1889 and 1893–1897
James Cleveland (1931–1991), American gospel singer, arranger, composer
Lemuel Roscoe Cleveland (1892–1969), American zoologist and protistologist
Moses Cleaveland (1754–1806), American lawyer, politician, soldier, and surveyor who founded the City of Cleveland
Pat Cleveland  (born 1950), American fashion model
Rose Cleveland (1846–1918), sister of Grover Cleveland, and 27th First Lady of the United States
Ruth Cleveland (1891–1904), daughter of Grover and Frances Cleveland
Tyrie Cleveland (born 1997), American football player

English-language surnames